William Rumsey (born October 18, 1841, in Bath, New York, died January 16, 1903, in Rochester, New York) was an American lawyer, diplomat and judge.  His father was David Rumsey (New York politician), a prominent lawyer, politician and judge.  He attended Williams College from 1858–61, departing for military service in his senior year.  Due to his military service, the college eventually awarded him a diploma.  A member of the New York State Militia, he was pressed into service immediately upon the outbreak of the Civil War.  From April 19, 1861, until his discharge in October 1865, he served in four different posts: as an adjutant-general in a recruiting office in Elmira, as an adjutant with the New York Light Artillery (with which unit he was wounded), as an aide to General Averell (with the rank of colonel) and in another position in West Virginia.

From 1866 to 1868 Rumsey was employed as the private secretary to the United States Minister to Japan.  Upon his return home in February 1868, he began the study of law in his father's office.  He was admitted to the bar on December 9, 1868.  During
this time of his study he was also a public speaker for the Republican Party.  He practiced law in partnership with his father from his admission to the latter's elevation to the Supreme Court in January 1873 and with a cousin from that time to his own elevation to the bench in 1881.

Rumsey's candidacy for the Supreme Court for the Seventh District in 1880 generated considerable bitterness within the Republican Party.  The elder Rumsey had reputedly cut a deal with Steuben County Judge Guy McMaster in 1873 that entailed that he, McMaster, would Succeed Rumsey Sr. Upon the later's retirement.  In addition, several factions had grown up in the district Republican bar which had come to a tacit arrangement to rotate the nominations for election to judicial vacancies between them.  Rumsey Jr's nomination violated both principles.  The opposition press in Rochester, New York, was not impressed "Little is known of the younger Rumsey" wrote the Union & Advertiser, "and the less of that little said, the better."  Rumsey captured the fall election in the heavily Republican Seventh District.

Rumsey sat as a trial judge for fifteen years.  In 1896, he was dispatched to Manhattan as an Associate Justice of the Appellate Division for the First Department, on which court he remained until the close of 1900.  He was then appointed to the Appellate Division for the Fourth Department, on which he remained for nine months.  He resigned this last post in October 1901, and sat as a trial judge until his death in Rochester, New York, on January 16, 1903.

External links
 

American lawyers
1903 deaths
1841 births